Sex Love & Pain II is the seventh studio album by American R&B singer-songwriter Tank. It was released on January 22, 2016, by Atlantic Records and his synergetic label R&B Money. Sex Love & Pain II debuted at number 15 on the US Billboard 200 with 20,000 equivalent album units; it sold 17,000 copies in its first week. The album boasted over 2.1 million streams. It was the nine best-selling album of the week. Sex Love & Pain II was Tank's fifth solo album to debut at number one on the Top R&B/Hip-Hop Albums.

Critical response

AllMusic editor Andy Kellman found that Sex Love & Pain II was "no nostalgia trip. While there are some instances where Tank is either longing for his woman or seeking repentance, the bulk of the album regards its title's first word. Tank's armed with another bunch of sleek slow-jam productions to complement his libidinous verses and, more than ever, his name is representative of his lyrical subtlety as much as his build [...] Tank's voice is as strong as ever. The repetition of the largely unimaginative lyrics and number of indistinct productions, however, make the album verge on monotony. This is not among his better, more imaginative releases."

Track listing

Charts

Weekly charts

Year-end charts

Release history

References

2016 albums
Tank (American singer) albums
Atlantic Records albums